Exaeretia scabella is a moth in the family Depressariidae. It is found in North America, where it has been recorded from Ohio.

The wingspan is 24 mm.

References

Moths described in 1873
Exaeretia
Moths of North America